Cameron Alexander Francis Walker-Wright (born April 24, 1989) professionally known as Cameron Walker, is a singer, songwriter, producer, and artist from Southport, Connecticut. He is currently in the band Twin XL along with John Gomez and Stephen Gomez.

He is currently based in Los Angeles, CA and has written songs for bands and artists such as Lindsey Stirling, All Time Low, Sabrina Carpenter, The Ready Set, among many others. He is also known from the band Weatherstar.

Cameron has composed music for brands such as Apple, T-Mobile, Victoria's Secret, Sleepy's and other brands. In addition, he has composed music for networks such as NBC, ABC, ESPN, among many others.

Career 

In 2012, his band Nineteen 80 Five (1985) was signed to Songs Music Publishing. Since then the band has gone on to release a collection of EPs and released the single, Summer Forever, on Hollywood Records.

Throughout 2012-2018, Walker-Wright has played guitar, bass guitar and wrote several songs for The Ready Set.

In 2014, Cameron signed to songwriter and producer, David Hodges, as his first signing to his publishing company Third & Verse which was a joint venture with Kobalt Music Group.

He is one third of the indie pop group Nekokat along with Jordan Witzigreuter (The Ready Set) and Jess Bowen (drummer of The Summer Set).

In 2018, he joined brothers Stephen and John Gomez of The Summer Set to form the band Twin XL. As of 2021, they have one full EP out titled How To Talk To Strangers and 6 singles. The band makes all of their own music, start-to-finish, and have admitted that it is "sometimes difficult" to balance recording with performances. Previously, the band toured with Jukebox The Ghost and The Mowgli's for the Making Friends Tour of 2019, and toured with I Don't Know How But They Found Me the same year. They ended 2019 touring with The Maine for The Mirror tour, and have most recently toured with Fitz and the Tantrums.

In early 2021, Cameron started a music label with fellow artist Jordan Witzigreuter, Swim Team Records. The company has featured a multitude of artists such as Future Coyote, TALKBAK, and Casey Abrams. The label's music has been featured in promotion for things such as the PGA Tour.

Discography

References

External links 

 Official Website

American producers
Living people
People from Southport, Connecticut
1989 births
Singer-songwriters from Connecticut